Prince Sukhumbhinanda or Phra Vorawongse Ther Phra Ong Chao Sukhumabhinanda (RTGS: Sukhumaphinan) (15 November 1923 - 10 April 2003) was a Prince of Thailand, a member of the Thai Royal Family. He was a member of the House of Paribatra (th: ราชสกุลบริพัตร), the Royal house descended from Chakri Dynasty. He was the direct grandson of King Chulalongkorn (Rama V).

Biography
He was born on 15 November 1923. He was the third son of Prince Paribatra Sukhumbandhu, the Prince of Nakhon Sawan (son of King Chulalongkorn (Rama V the Great) and Queen Sukhumala Marasri) and Mom Sombhand Paribatra na Ayudhya (née Palkavongse na Ayudhya, daughter of Mom Luang Chum Palkavongse). After born, he was titled Mom Chao (Prince) Until in the reign of King Prajadhipok (Rama VII), he was elevated into Phra Vorawongse Ther Phra Ong Chao; (Prince) on 8 November 1927. He had an elder sister; Princess Induratana.

As a surviving male descendant of Queen Sukhumala Marasri, the Prince was a potential heir to the Thai throne, according to the 1924 Palace Law of Succession. Prince Sukhumabhinanda did his royal duty as the secretary of Thai Red Cross Society between 1968 and 1969 and later he became the vice-president of the Thai Red Cross between 1969 - 1973.

Marriage
He married Dusdi na Thalang. After marriage, his wife got the title Mom, which is the title for Thai princes' commoner wives. The couple had 2 sons;
 Mom Rajawongse Sukhumbhand Paribatra (born 22 September 1952), thai politician, a Member of parliament of the Democrat Party. And was elected as the 15th Governor of Bangkok. Married firstly with Nuchwadi Bamrungtrakul and secondly with Savitri Paribatra na Ayudhya, has 2 sons;
 Mom Luang Binitbhand Paribatra (born 5 November 1980)
 Mom Luang Varabhinanda Paribatra (born 17 August 1993)
 Mom Rajawongse Varoros Paribatra (born 5 November 1959), married firstly with Nanthini Sirisingha, secondly with Pathanaphorn Niyonsiri, and thirdly with La-ongdao Paribatra na Ayudhya; has 2 sons and 1 daughter.
 Mom Luang Vorabinit Paribatra (born 29 May 1990)
 Mom Luang Subhanan Paribatra (born 20 June 1998)
 Mom Luang Varodaya Paribatra (born 21 November 1999)

Prince Sukhumabhinanda died on 10 April 2003, at the age of 79.

Ancestry

Royal decorations
  Knight Cross of the Most Illustrious Order of Chula Chom Klao (First Class)
  Knight Grand Cordon of the Most Exalted Order of the White Elephant
  Knight Grand Cordon of the Most Noble Order of the Crown of Thailand
  King Rama IX the Great Royal Cypher Medal

References
 Paul M. Handley, "The King Never Smiles" Yale University Press: 2006, 
 http://freepages.genealogy.rootsweb.com/~royalty/thailand/i101.html

1923 births
2003 deaths
Thai male Phra Ong Chao
Paribatra family
Knights Grand Cross of the Order of Chula Chom Klao
Thai male Mom Chao
20th-century Chakri dynasty
21st-century Chakri dynasty